Karmala may refer to:

Karmala, a town and taluka headquarters in Solapur district, Maharashtra, India
Karmala Taluka, a taluka in Solapur district, Maharashtra, India
Karmala (Rural), a village in Solapur district, Maharashtra, India
Karmala (Vidhan Sabha constituency)
A classical name for the Zamantı River